Beulah is a term from the Biblical Hebrew to refer to the Lord's country, Beulah (land). It may also refer to:

People

Beulah (given name), derivation of the name and list of people with this name
Beulah (singer), UK-based female singer-songwriter

Places
Australia
Beulah, Gilead, a heritage-listed property in the south-western Sydney suburb of Gilead, New South Wales
Beulah, Tasmania, a township
Beulah, Victoria, a town

United Kingdom (Wales)
Beulah, Ceredigion, a village
Beulah, Powys, a village

Canada
Beulah, Manitoba, a village

United States
Beulah, Alabama, an unincorporated community
Beulah, Colorado, an unincorporated town
Beulah, Escambia County, Florida, an unincorporated community in Escambia County, Florida
Beulah, Orange County, Florida, an unincorporated community in Orange County, Florida
Beulah, Georgia, an unincorporated town
Beulah, Iowa, an unincorporated community
Beulah, Kansas, an unincorporated community
Beulah, Maryland, an unincorporated community
Beulah, Michigan, a village
Beulah Township, Cass County, Minnesota
Beulah, Mississippi, a town
Beulah, Missouri, an unincorporated community
Beulah, New York, a hamlet
Bottom, North Carolina, an unincorporated community more commonly known as Beulah locally
Beulah, North Dakota, a city
Beulah, Oregon, an unincorporated community
Beulah, Pennsylvania, a ghost town on the Ghost Town Trail rail trail
Beulah, Johnson County, Texas, a former community
Beulah, Virginia, an unincorporated community
Beulah, Wyoming, a census-designated place
Beulah Road, a section of Virginia State Route 613 (Fairfax County)
Lake Beulah, Wisconsin, an unincorporated community in the town of East Troy, Walworth County

Arts and entertainment
 Beulah (Blake), in William Blake's mythology is the land, a dreamy paradise  
 Beulah (novel), by author Augusta Jane Evans published in 1859
Beulah (radio and TV series), a 1940s radio series and 1950s television series, and the main character of that show
Beulah (band), a rock band associated with the Elephant Six Collective
"Beulah", a song by Devo, performed on DEVO Live: The Mongoloid Years
Beulah, an underground all-female town in the novel The Passion of New Eve by Angela Carter
Beulah, an album by John Paul White

Other
Hurricane Beulah (disambiguation), two hurricanes and a tropical storm
Beulah College, a school in Tonga
Beulah Baptist Church, Alexandria, Virginia
Beulah Presbyterian Church, Churchill, Pennsylvania
Beulah or Beulah Speckled Face, a breed of sheep from the area around Beulah, Powys

See also
Beula (disambiguation)
Beulah Heights (disambiguation)
Beulah Land, a gospel hymn dating from 1875 or 1876
Beulah Park (disambiguation)
Land of Beulah, a fictional location in The Pilgrim's Progress by John Bunyan
Sweet Beulah Land, a Southern gospel song of 1973 by Squire Parsons